Josef Zelený (24 March 1824 in Rajhrad - 3 May 1886 in Brno)  was a Moravian painter who was devoted to the formation of altarpieces, portraits and paintings of historical scenes, particular ones of a biblical nature.

He studied in Brno, Prague, Vienna and Paris.

See also
List of Czech painters

References

1824 births
1886 deaths
People from Rajhrad
Czech painters
Czech male painters
19th-century painters of historical subjects